Silas M. Holmes (July 21, 1816June 1905) was a Michigan politician.

Early life
Holmes was born in Stonington, Connecticut on July 21, 1816.

Career
In the 1850s, Holmes was a leading dry goods merchant in Detroit. In 1854, Holmes was nominated for the position of Michigan State Treasurer on the first Republican ticket in the state. He was elected to that position, and became the first Republican Michigan State Treasurer in 1855. He served in this capacity until 1858. In 1887, Holmes moved away from Detroit to San Francisco, California, where he engaged in business.

Personal life
Holmes had ten children, and he was survived by four of them.

Death
Holmes died in June 1905 in Corning, California.

References

1816 births
1905 deaths
American merchants
Politicians from Detroit
People from Stonington, Connecticut
Businesspeople from Detroit
Businesspeople from San Francisco
Michigan Republicans
State treasurers of Michigan
19th-century American politicians
19th-century American businesspeople